Richard Wisker (born 1 February 1995) is a BAFTA Award-nominated British actor and presenter from Dagenham, England, known for his role as Liam O'Donovan in Tracy Beaker Returns. From 2013 to 2015 he portrayed Rich in the CBBC series Dani's Castle. Wisker also played the role Declan in Millie Inbetween and Flatmates.

Career
Wisker made his television debut in 2008 as a guest star on the British police drama The Bill, playing Mason Kemble in a two-episode story called "Hold Me Tight". He later returned to television as Jono Blake in an episode of Law & Order: UK. He also guest-starred in The Sarah Jane Adventures in 2010, in two episodes titled "Lost in Time", featuring a character named George Woods, from the year 1941. His most notable role is Liam O'Donovan in the CBBC drama Tracy Beaker Returns.

In 2010, Wisker was nominated for a children's BAFTA for Best Actor.

In May 2011, Wisker began presenting Friday Download on the CBBC Channel, a children's entertainment series alongside Georgia Lock, Dionne Bromfield, Ceallach Spellman, Tyger Drew-Honey and Aidan Davis. It has so far spanned nine series.

In March 2012, Wisker released his debut single and held a signing at Stratford Centre.

From 2013 to 2015, Wisker portrayed Rich in CBBC comedy Dani's Castle.

He has a starring role in the film Up All Night based on the CBBC show Friday Download.
In 2017 Wisker announced he would be starring as the lead in the film Supernova by Noveray Limited. The star filmed himself flying into Monaco to sign the deal.

Filmography

References

External links

1995 births
Living people
People from Dagenham
English male child actors
English male television actors
English television presenters
21st-century English male actors
Male actors from London